Bud is an unincorporated community in Union Township, Johnson County, Indiana.

History
A post office was established at Bud in 1889, and remained in operation until it was discontinued in 1902. The community was named for a storekeeper's son, Bud Vandivier.

Geography

References

Unincorporated communities in Johnson County, Indiana
Unincorporated communities in Indiana
Indianapolis metropolitan area